Ronald 'Ron' F. Miller (born November 12, 1954 in Geneva, New York) is an American politician and former Democratic member of the West Virginia Senate representing District 10 from 2011 to 2017. In September 2017, Miller resigned from the Senate to become agriculture liaison in the administration of Governor Jim Justice.

Education
Miller earned his BA in social studies from Shepherd College (now Shepherd University) and his MA in education from the Southern Baptist Theological Seminary.

Elections
2010 When District 10 Republican Senator Jesse Guills retired and left the seat open, Miller was unopposed for the May 11, 2010 Democratic Primary, winning with 8,391 votes, and won the November 2, 2010 General election with 14,093 votes (51.9%) against Republican nominee Johnny Barnes.

References

External links
Official page at the West Virginia Legislature

Ron Miller at Ballotpedia
Ronald (Ron) F. Miller at the National Institute on Money in State Politics

1954 births
Living people
Politicians from Geneva, New York
People from Lewisburg, West Virginia
Shepherd University alumni
Southern Baptist Theological Seminary alumni
Democratic Party West Virginia state senators
21st-century American politicians